Xingxueanthus is an extinct genus of plants of dubious affinity which existed in China during the middle Jurassic period. It was first named by Xin Wang and Shijun Wang in 2010 and the type species is Xingxueanthus sinensis.

Xingxueanthus is known only from a single specimen of carbonized inflorescence. There is debate as to the taxonomic position  of Xingxueanthus, being either an early Angiosperm, a new class of Gymnosperm, or a poorly preserved conipherophyte cone.

References

Prehistoric angiosperm genera
Fossil taxa described in 2010
Jurassic plants